Tarmo Neemelo (born 10 February 1982) is an Estonian retired professional footballer who last played as a forward for Meistriliiga club Paide Linnameeskond.

Neemelo was the top goalscorer in the 2005 Meistriliiga with 41 goals, and won the Estonian Silverball award in 2006.

Club career

Early career
Neemelo started playing football with Lelle. He then spent several years playing for various reserve and feeder teams affiliated with Flora.

TVMK
In 2004, he signed for Meistriliiga club TVMK. In the 2005 season, he won his first Meistriliiga title, scoring a league record 41 goals, which put him in 12th place in the European Golden Shoe.

Helsingborg
In 2006, he signed for Swedish Allsvenskan club Helsingborgs IF, to potentially partner fellow striker Henrik Larsson. However, Neemelo was unable to secure a first-team position and was loaned back to TVMK. In 2007, he was once again loaned out, this time to Superettan club GIF Sundsvall.

MYPA
In February 2008, he signed a two-year contract with Finnish Veikkausliiga club MYPA.

Zulte Waregem
In January 2009, he signed for Belgian side Zulte Waregem. He was mostly used as a substitute, being a part of the starting line-up just twice. He was released by Zulte Waregem in July 2009 by mutual consent.

Levadia
In 2009, Neemelo returned to Estonia and signed with Levadia. He won his second Meistriliiga title in the 2009 season.

Nõmme Kalju
Neemelo's contract with Levadia ran out after the 2010 season. On 7 February 2011, Neemelo signed a two-year contract with Nõmme Kalju. He was the team's top goalscorer in the league in 2011 and 2012 with 22 goals in both seasons. Neemelo won his third Meistriliiga title in the 2012 season.

International career
Neemelo made his international debut for Estonia on 20 April 2005, against Norway in a friendly. He scored his first goal for the national team on 28 May 2006, in a friendly match against Turkey. The goal won him the Estonian Silverball award.

International goals
Estonia score listed first, score column indicates score after each Neemelo goal.

Honours

Club
TVMK
Meistriliiga: 2005
Estonian Supercup: 2005, 2006

Levadia
Meistriliiga: 2009
Estonian Supercup: 2010

Nõmme Kalju
Meistriliiga: 2012
Estonian Cup: 2014–15

Individual
Meistriliiga top scorer: 2005
Estonian Silverball: 2006

References

External links

1982 births
Living people
Sportspeople from Paide
Estonian footballers
Association football forwards
Esiliiga players
Meistriliiga players
FC Kuressaare players
FC TVMK players
FCI Levadia Tallinn players
Nõmme Kalju FC players
Paide Linnameeskond players
Allsvenskan players
Helsingborgs IF players
Superettan players
GIF Sundsvall players
Veikkausliiga players
Myllykosken Pallo −47 players
Belgian Pro League players
S.V. Zulte Waregem players
Estonia youth international footballers
Estonia under-21 international footballers
Estonia international footballers
Estonian expatriate footballers
Estonian expatriate sportspeople in Sweden
Expatriate footballers in Sweden
Estonian expatriate sportspeople in Finland
Expatriate footballers in Finland
Estonian expatriate sportspeople in Belgium
Expatriate footballers in Belgium